The Anti Crow River is a small river located in Arthur's Pass National Park, Canterbury, New Zealand. It is a tributary of the Waimakariri River and is named because its valley is opposite that of the Crow River. Mount Damfool is at the head of the Anti Crow River valley.

See also
List of rivers of New Zealand

References

Land Information New Zealand - Search for Place Names

Rivers of Canterbury, New Zealand
Rivers of New Zealand